Freak Weather is a 1999 American drama film directed by Mary Kuryla and starring Jacqueline McKenzie, Jacob Chase and Aida Turturro.  It based on Kuryla's short story of the same name.

Cast
Jacqueline McKenzie
Aida Turturro
John Carroll Lynch
Jacob Chase
Jerry Adler
Robert Wisdom
Justin Pierce
John Heard

Reception
Eddie Cockrell of Variety gave the film a mixed review and wrote, "Buried in ambitious intentions, Freak Weather is an audacious yet distasteful debacle that squanders terrific Aussie thesp Jacqueline McKenzie (Romper Stomper, Deep Blue Sea) as an abused g.f. who debases herself in a vain attempt to please her offscreen paramour."

Noel Murray of The A.V. Club gave the film a negative review and wrote, "The movie starts out comically bizarre and becomes pointlessly violent, driven by behavior and characters so far outside the norm that they're useful only as metaphors for abandonment. Freak Weather also suffers from an overbearing heavy-metal score, and too many name actors in small roles."

References

External links
 

American drama films
1999 drama films
1999 films
Films based on short fiction
1990s English-language films
1990s American films